Alenatea is a genus of Asian orb-weaver spiders first described by D. X. Song, Ming-Sheng Zhu & J. Chen in 1999.  it contains only three species.

References

Araneidae
Araneomorphae genera
Spiders of Asia